Yekaterina Yevseyeva (born 22 June 1988 in Almaty, Kazakhstan) is a Kazakhstani high jumper.

She was born in Almaty. She won bronze medals at the 2005 World Youth Championships and the 2006 World Junior Championships. She also competed at the 2008 World Indoor Championships and the 2008 Olympic Games without reaching the final.

Her personal best jump is 1.98 metres, achieved in May 2008 in Tashkent. This is the Asian record, although she shares it with two athletes: Nadejda Dusanova and Svetlana Radzivil.

Major competitions record

References 

1988 births
Living people
Kazakhstani female high jumpers
Sportspeople from Almaty
Athletes (track and field) at the 2008 Summer Olympics
Olympic athletes of Kazakhstan
Universiade medalists in athletics (track and field)
Universiade silver medalists for Kazakhstan
Medalists at the 2009 Summer Universiade